Chikhradze is a Georgian surname. Notable people with the surname include:

Aleksandr Chikhradze (born 1975), Russian footballer and coach
Giorgi Chikhradze (born 1967), Georgian footballer and manager
Pikria Chikhradze (born 1966), Georgian politician

Georgian-language surnames